Daryl Walker (born December 29, 1981) is an American goalball player who competes in international level events. He has participated at the Paralympic Games in 2008 and 2016 where he won a silver medal in the men's tournament. He is also a double World bronze medalist as well as a triple Parapan American Games silver medalist. Daryl Walker is an active Member of the Church of Jesus Christ Of LatterDay Saints, He has held many Callings within his church and has taught those about his faith.

References

External links 
 
 

1981 births
Living people
Male goalball players
Paralympic goalball players of the United States
Goalball players at the 2008 Summer Paralympics
Goalball players at the 2016 Summer Paralympics
Medalists at the 2016 Summer Paralympics
Medalists at the 2011 Parapan American Games
Medalists at the 2015 Parapan American Games
Medalists at the 2019 Parapan American Games
Sportspeople from Hoboken, New Jersey
Sportspeople from Jacksonville, Florida
People with albinism
Goalball players at the 2020 Summer Paralympics